Daniel Alexandre Thiaw (14 April 1937 – 24 November 2018) was a Senegalese sprinter. He competed in the men's 4 × 400 metres relay at the 1964 Summer Olympics.

References

External links
 

1947 births
2018 deaths
Athletes (track and field) at the 1964 Summer Olympics
Senegalese male sprinters
Olympic athletes of Senegal
Place of birth missing